Seidu (Popular In Ghana) is an African name that is heard around Ghana, Nigeria, Ethiopia and other areas. 

As it originated from Arabic decent (Sa'id), which means "happy," and is used in Muslim homes in Africa, pronunciations may differ:

Seidu (Zuh-Eh*silent*-Duh-Oo)

Seidu (Suh-Eigh-Doo)

Seidu (Se-Ay-Du)

Given name

 Seidu Bancey (born 1990), Ghanaian football striker
 Seidu Salifu (born 1993), Ghanaian football player
 Seidu Ilorin (born ????), Nigerian soldier
 Seidu Yahaya (born 1989), Ghanaian football player
 Seidu Olawale (born 1962), Nigerian wrestler 
 Seidu Tawore, (born 1999), Nigerian photographer 
 Seidu Hamid (born 1978), Ethiopian strategist and businessman 
 Seidu Dozo (born ????), Nigerian soldier

Surname

 Abu Seidu (born 1987), Ghanaian football striker
 Abdul Seidu (born ????), Ghanaian Actor
 Rachel Seidu (born ????), Ghanaian-Nigerian, Filmmaker
 Henry Seidu Daanaa (born 1955), Ghanaian politician and lawyer
 Mumuni Abudu Seidu, Ghanaian politician
 Franklin Jay Seidu, (born 2001), Persian-Nigerian model
 Christine Seidu, (born 1997), Nigerian model 

Similar Names

 Seydou Keita (born 1980), Malian former midfielder 
 Seydou Keïta (1921-2001), Mali Photographer 
 Sa’id Of Mogadishu, Somali Traveler in the 14th century 
 Said Shavershian, (born 1986), Aziz Shavershian’s brother and Model
 Sa’id ibn Jubayr (665 AD - 714 AD), Kufa (Modern day Iraq) Jurist

Ghanaian surnames